A calf (: calves) is a young domestic cow or bull. Calves are reared to become adult cattle or are slaughtered for their meat, called veal, and hide.

The term calf is also used for some other species. See "Other animals" below.

Terminology 

"Calf" is the term used from birth to weaning, when it becomes known as a weaner or weaner calf, though in some areas the term "calf" may be used until the animal is a yearling. The birth of a calf is known as calving. A calf that has lost its mother is an orphan calf, also known as a poddy or poddy-calf in British. Bobby calves are young calves which are to be slaughtered for human consumption. A young female calf from birth until she has had a calf of her own is called a heifer
(). In the American Old West, a motherless or small, runty calf was sometimes referred to as a dodie.

The term "calf" is also used for some other species. See "Other animals" below.

Early development 

Calves may be produced by natural means, or by artificial breeding using artificial insemination or embryo transfer.

Calves are born after nine months. They usually stand within a few minutes of calving, and suckle within an hour. However, for the first few days they are not easily able to keep up with the rest of the herd, so young calves are often left hidden by their mothers, who visit them several times a day to suckle them. By a week old the calf is able to follow the mother all the time.

Some calves are ear tagged soon after birth, especially those that are stud cattle in order to correctly identify their dams (mothers), or in areas (such as the EU) where tagging is a legal requirement for cattle. Typically when the calves are about two months old they are branded, ear marked, castrated and vaccinated.

Calf rearing systems 

The single suckler system of rearing calves is similar to that occurring naturally in wild cattle, where each calf is suckled by its own mother until it is weaned at about nine months old. This system is commonly used for rearing beef cattle throughout the world.

Cows kept on poor forage (as is typical in subsistence farming) produce a limited amount of milk. A calf left with such a mother all the time can easily drink all the milk, leaving none for human consumption. For dairy production under such circumstances, the calf's access to the cow must be limited, for example by penning the calf and bringing the mother to it once a day after partly milking her. The small amount of milk available for the calf under such systems may mean that it takes a longer time to rear, and in subsistence farming it is therefore common for cows to calve only in alternate years.

In more intensive dairy farming, cows can easily be bred and fed to produce far more milk than one calf can drink. In the multi-suckler system, several calves are fostered onto one cow in addition to her own, and these calves' mothers can then be used wholly for milk production. More commonly, calves of dairy cows are fed formula milk from soon after birth, usually from a bottle or bucket.

Purebred female calves of dairy cows are reared as replacement dairy cows. Most purebred dairy calves are produced by artificial insemination (AI). By this method each bull can serve many cows, so only a very few of the purebred dairy male calves are needed to provide bulls for breeding. The remainder of the male calves may be reared for beef or veal;  Only a proportion of purebred heifers are needed to provide replacement cows, so often some of the cows in dairy herds are put to a beef bull to produce crossbred calves suitable for rearing as beef.

Veal calves may be reared entirely on milk formula and killed at about 18 or 20 weeks as "white" veal, or fed on grain and hay and killed at 22 to 35 weeks to produce red or pink veal.

Growth 

Heifers will weigh at least  at eight months of age.

Calves are usually weaned at about eight to nine months of age, but depending on the season and condition of the dam, they might be weaned earlier. They may be paddock weaned, often next to their mothers, or weaned in stockyards. The latter system is preferred by some as it accustoms the weaners to the presence of people and they are trained to take feed other than grass. Small numbers may also be weaned with their dams with the use of weaning nose rings or nosebands which results in the mothers rejecting the calves' attempts to suckle. Many calves are also weaned when they are taken to the large weaner auction sales that are conducted in the south eastern states of Australia. Victoria and New South Wales have yardings of up to 8,000 weaners (calves) for auction sale in one day. The best of these weaners may go to the butchers. Others will be purchased by re-stockers to grow out and fatten on grass or as potential breeders. In the United States these weaners may be known as feeders and would be placed directly into feedlots.

At about 12 months old a beef heifer reaches puberty if she is well grown.

Diseases 
Calves suffer from few congenital abnormalities but the Akabane virus is widely distributed in temperate to tropical regions of the world. The virus is a teratogenic pathogen which causes abortions, stillbirths, premature births and congenital abnormalities, but occurs only during some years.

Uses 
Calf meat for human consumption is called veal, and is usually produced from the male calves of Dairy cattle.  Also eaten are calf's brains and calf liver. The hide is used to make calfskin, or tanned into leather and called calf leather, or sometimes in the US "novillo", the Spanish term. The fourth compartment of the stomach of slaughtered milk-fed calves is the source of rennet. The intestine is used to make Goldbeater's skin, and is the source of Calf Intestinal Alkaline Phosphatase (CIP).

Dairy cows can only produce milk after having calved, and dairy cows need to produce one calf each year in order to remain in production. Female calves will become a replacement dairy cow.  Male dairy calves are generally reared for beef or veal; relatively few are kept for breeding purposes.

Other animals 

In English the term "calf" is used by extension for the young of various other large species of mammal. In addition to other bovid species (such as bison, yak and water buffalo), these include the young of camels, dolphins, elephants, giraffes, hippopotamuses, deer (such as moose, elk (wapiti) and red deer), rhinoceroses, porpoises, whales, walruses and larger seals. (Generally, the adult males of these same species are called "bulls" and the adult females "cows".) However, common domestic species tend to have their own specific names, such as lamb, foal used for all Equidae, or piglet used for all suidae.

References

External links 

Weaning-beef-calves
Calving on Ropin' the Web, Agriculture and Food, Government of Alberta, Canada
Winter Feeding Sites and Calf Scours, Kansas State University

Cattle
Vertebrate developmental biology
Articles containing video clips